Spofforth 

History
Spofforth grew as a village at the time that Knaresborough was the important town in the area with Harrogate and Wetherby being less so.  The village saw the building of the castle in the thirteenth century. Eighteenth century Knaresborough road builder Blind Jack Metcalf spent the latter years of his life in the village and is buried in the church yard. Stockeld Park, a Palladian villa was built in the 19th century. The railway came to Spofforth in 1847 with the building of the Harrogate to Church Fenton Line with Spofforth being the only intermediate station between Wetherby York Road station and Harrogate station. The line closed to passengers in 1964 and to goods in 1966 as part of the Beeching axe. Part of this forms the Harland Way cycle path which runs as far as Thorp Arch.

Spofforth was a part of the historic West Riding of Yorkshire, until 1974.

Churches 
All Saints' Church is the parish church of Spofforth and Kirk Deighton with Follifoot and Little Ribston. The date of the church's foundation is unknown and it is not mentioned in the Domesday Book. In 1893 a portion of an Anglo-Saxon cross was found built into the stairs of the tower. It is likely that an earlier church existed and was rebuilt between 1175 and 1200, with the doorway in the south porch dating from around this time. The first rector was Henry de Evesham inducted in 1280. Another was William de Melon (1310–1317) Treasurer of England and keeper of the great seal. The church tower was built in 1450. The earliest bell dates from between 1570 and 1593.

The church was restored "in an elegant and substantial manner" during 1854–5 under the supervision of the architect, Mr J W Hugall of Cheltenham.  It was re-opened in September 1855 by the Lord Bishop of Ripon.  There was criticism at the time of the "most ugly and objectionable pew" which occupied the south side of the church, and the fact that "the seats on the north are, consequently, incorrectly arranged".

James Tripp (1847–1879) built the church and school at Follifoot and also built the schools at Linton and Spofforth.

Spofforth Methodist Church, no longer in active use, is on School Lane.

Pubs
The village has two pubs, the Castle and the Railway.  The Castle is the larger pub in the village and has a single open plan room.  The Railway is a small pub owned by Samuel Smith's Old Brewery with a traditional lounge and tap room configuration and was converted from two railway cottages.  Two other pubs in the village did exist, the King William IV which closed in the early 2000s and the Prince of Wales in Castle Street closed in around 1927 and is now a private residence (Oulton House).  The Prince of Wales served as the place where village inquests were held during the 1800s.

Transport
Spofforth is situated on the A661 Wetherby to Harrogate Road.  A bypass has been previously proposed but has never been developed.  The village is served by two bus services, the 7 (linking the village with Harrogate, Wetherby, Seacroft at Leeds), and the X70 (both linking it with Harrogate, Follifoot and Wetherby).

Other landmarks

The ruins of Spofforth Castle, which date from the 13th century, are close to the centre of the village.
Stockeld Park, south of the village near Sicklinghall, is a stone-built 18th-century Palladian villa.

Notable people
Andrew Brons, former National Front activist and British National Party MEP for Yorkshire and the Humber lives in the village.
Laurence Eusden (1688–1730), who was made British Poet Laureate by George I  in 1718, was baptised in Spofforth.
Rev Dr William Osborne Greenwood MD FRSE (1873–1947) a curious blend of both minister and qualified surgeon.
Blind Jack Metcalf (1717–1810), the road builder, lived in Spofforth in his later years and is buried in the village churchyard.
Gerald Smithson (1926–1970), Yorkshire, Leicestershire and England cricketer, was born and grew up in Spofforth.  His great-grandparents, Joseph and Rosina Smithsons, are buried in the village churchyard. His grandfather, George Robert Smithsons (1869–1955), played for Spofforth Cricket Club for over fifty years, and his team photographs still hang in the current Spofforth cricket pavilion.

References

External links

 Spofforth at genuki

 
Villages in North Yorkshire
English Heritage sites in North Yorkshire
Borough of Harrogate